The 23rd Virginia Cavalry Regiment was a cavalry regiment raised in Virginia for service in the Confederate States Army during the American Civil War. The regiment was recruited primarily in the counties of Hampshire, Hardy, Morgan, Berkeley, Frederick, Clarke, Shenandoah, Warren, Rockingham, Augusta, Allegheny and Henrico. It fought in the Shenandoah Valley.

Virginia's 23rd Cavalry Regiment was organized in April, 1864, by consolidating seven companies of the 41st Battalion Virginia Cavalry and two companies of O'Ferrall's Battalion Virginia Cavalry. The unit served in Imboden's Brigade and was involved in various conflicts in the Shenandoah Valley. It disbanded during April, 1865. The field officers were Colonel Robert White, Lieutenant Colonel Charles T. O'Ferrall, and Major Fielding H. Calmese.

See also

List of Virginia Civil War units
List of West Virginia Civil War Confederate units

References

Units and formations of the Confederate States Army from Virginia
Hampshire County, West Virginia, in the American Civil War
1864 establishments in Virginia
Military units and formations established in 1864
1865 disestablishments in Virginia
Military units and formations disestablished in 1865